Nathumajra is a village in the Malerkotla district of Punjab, India. Formerly a part of the Sangrur district, it is located in the Ahmedgarh tehsil. As per 2016 stats, Nathu Majra village is also a gram panchayat.

History
Nathumajra Traces its history back to Medieval India, however its current landscape was formed after partition of India and Pakistan during Indian independence movement.

Geography
Nathumajra lies in a fertile, alluvial plain with an irrigation canal system. It extends from the latitudes 30.648758° North to longitudes 75.879837° East.

Climate
The geography and subtropical latitudinal location of Nathumajra leads to large variations in temperature from month to month. It experience temperatures around 5 °C (41 °F) from December to February {winter season}, ground frost is commonly found in the village during the winter season. The temperature rises gradually with high humidity and overcast skies. However, the rise in temperature is steep when the sky is clear and humidity is low. The maximum temperatures usually occur in mid-May and June {summer season}. The temperature remains above 40 °C (104 °F) during this period.

Politics
As per constitution of India and Panchayati raj (India) Act, Nathu Majra village is administrated by Sarpanch (Head of Village) who is the elected representative of village. Amolak Singh is the elected sarpanch of the village. Other elected members are Manjit Kaur, Amarjit Kaur, Charanjit Kaur, Gurmail Singh, Gurinderpal Singh, Raghveer Singh and Jagtar Singh

Demographics
Nathu Majra is a medium size village located in Malerkotla of Sangrur district, Punjab, with total 289 families residing. Nathu Majra has a population of 1390 of which 725 are males while 665 are females as per Population Census 2011.
In Nathu Majra, population of children with age 0-6 is 119 which makes up 8.56% of total population of village. Average Sex Ratio of the village is 917 which is higher than Punjab state average of 895. Child Sex Ratio for the village as per census is 951, higher than Punjab average of 846.

Education
Nathumajra has one Primary school, one Middle school and one Senior Secondary school. The village has higher literacy rate compared to Punjab. In 2011, literacy rate of village was 82.06% compared to 75.84% of Punjab. In Nathu Majra Male literacy stands at 89.01% while female literacy rate was 74.46%.

Sports
Punjabi Kabaddi, Cricket and Volleyball {Volleyball variations#Shooting volleyball} are the three most popular sports played in Nathumajra.

References

Villages in Malerkotla district